The Civil Courts Building is a landmark court building used by the 22nd Judicial Circuit Court of Missouri in St. Louis, Missouri.

The building with its pyramid shaped roof is prominently featured in the center of photos of the Gateway Arch from the Illinois side as its location on the Memorial Plaza is lined up in the middle directly behind the Old Courthouse.

The building was part of an $87 million bond issue ratified by voters in 1923 to build monumental buildings along the Memorial Plaza which also included Kiel Auditorium and the Municipal Services Building.  The Plaza and the buildings were part of St. Louis's City Beautiful plan.

It replaced the Old Courthouse as the city's court building and its construction prompted the descendants of the founding father Auguste Chouteau to unsuccessfully sue the city to get the Old Courthouse back since the stipulation was that it was to always be the courthouse.

The pyramid roof on the top was designed to resemble the Mausoleum at Halicarnassus which was one of the Seven Wonders of the Ancient World. It features 32 Ionic columns. They are made of Indiana limestone.

These sphinx-like creatures were sculpted by Cleveland sculptor, Steven A. Rebeck.

Some architectural elements from the building have been removed in renovations and taken to the Sauget, Illinois storage site of the National Building Arts Center.

During St. Louis PrideFest, the building has lit its columns up in a rotating rainbow pattern. In 2016, the top of the building lit up with 49 purple lights to show solidarity to the victims in the Orlando nightclub shooting. The tradition of Pride started in 2012, when the building was first lit up.

References

Government buildings completed in 1930
Courthouses in Missouri
Skyscraper office buildings in St. Louis
Downtown St. Louis
Buildings and structures in St. Louis
1930 establishments in Missouri